Tom Scott (1875-1947) was a Scotland international rugby union player. He played as a centre and half-back.

In 1895, whilst noting Scott's resemblance to Tom Scott - the Scotland international forward of the same name - as a 'dead snip'  when the back was still uncapped, the Glasgow Evening Post went on to state that Gedge, Gowans and Scott were unexcelled as the best half-backs in Britain.

Occasionally Scott went by the initials 'T. L. S.'. Scott himself said this happened to differentiate between himself and the other Tom Scott of Melrose when both were Scotland internationals (Tom Scott of Melrose was 'T. M. S. - his middle name was Monro) but this was not strictly true. It was discovered that the rugby commentator Argus Junior of The Hawick Express referred to Tom 'Langholm' Scott and Tom 'Melrose' Scott to differentiate the players in his rugby column.

Rugby Union career

Amateur career

He played for Langholm and then Hawick.

Provincial career

He played for South of Scotland against Cumberland in 1894.

International career

He was capped 11 times for Scotland from 1896 to 1900.

Administrative career

For the 1914–15 season he was President of the Scottish Rugby Union. The First World War intervened; so no other elections were held. When the war finished Scott was elected for another term 1919 to 20. Effectively then, Scott held the post of President from 1914 to 1920, and this was the longest term in office of any President of the Union.

Death

As a mark of respect in the wake of Scott's death, it was noted that Langholm players wore black arm bands when playing in the Hawick Sevens of 19 April 1947.

Family

His brother James Alexander Scott played for Langholm and was capped by South of Scotland District in 1898.

References

1875 births
1947 deaths
Hawick RFC players
Langholm RFC players
Presidents of the Scottish Rugby Union
Rugby union players from Langholm
Scotland international rugby union players
Scottish rugby union players
South of Scotland District (rugby union) players
Rugby union centres